Antonio Acosta Rivera (born 22 November 1971 in Madrid) is a Spanish former footballer who played as a midfielder, and is a current manager.

Honours
Spain U21
UEFA European Under-21 Championship third place: 1994

References

External links

Stats and bio at Cadistas1910 

1971 births
Living people
Spanish footballers
Footballers from Madrid
Association football midfielders
La Liga players
Segunda División players
Segunda División B players
Tercera División players
RSD Alcalá players
Atlético Madrid B players
Atlético Madrid footballers
Cádiz CF players
UE Lleida players
CD Logroñés footballers
Sestao Sport Club footballers
Getafe CF footballers
Belgian Pro League players
Royal Antwerp F.C. players
Spanish expatriate footballers
Expatriate footballers in Belgium
Spanish expatriate sportspeople in Belgium
Spain youth international footballers
Spain under-21 international footballers
Spanish football managers
Segunda División B managers
Tercera División managers
RSD Alcalá managers
CD Toledo managers